Bo Davis (born May 17, 1970) is an American football coach and former defensive lineman who is currently the defensive line coach for Texas.

Coaching career

LSU
Davis began his coaching career at his alma mater when he earned second team all SEC in 1995 as a graduate assistant. He left in 1997 to become an assistant North Shore High School in Texas. He returned to LSU in 2002 under Nick Saban as an assistant strength and conditioning coach. He won a national championship in 2003 and was retained by Les Miles for the 2005 season.

Miami Dolphins
Davis joined Saban's Dolphins staff as an assistant defensive line coach for the 2006.

Alabama (first stint)
Following Saban once again, Davis joined the Crimson Tide as the teams defensive line coach in 2007. There he won another championship in 2009. However he would leave following the 2010 season.

Texas (first stint)
Davis then joined Mack Brown's Texas Longhorns where he coached the defensive tackles from 2011 to 2013.

Alabama (second stint)
Following his three years coaching at Texas, and one week as USC’s defensive line coach, Davis returned to Alabama in 2014 to coach the defensive line replacing Chris Rumph. Additionally he won another national championship in 2015. He resigned after a recruiting controversy .

Jacksonville Jaguars
Davis returned to the NFL to coach as an intern for the Jacksonville Jaguars in 2016.

UTSA
For the 2017 season, Davis was in San Antonio coaching the Roadrunners defensive line.

Detroit Lions
Davis returned to the NFL once more to be the defensive line coach under Matt Patricia in Detroit. He stayed there until Patricia's firing during the 2020 season.

Texas (second stint)
Davis returned for a second stint with the Longhorns, this time under Steve Sarkisian working as their defensive line coach.

Personal life
Bo and his wife, Omeika, have three children.

References

1970 births
Living people
African-American coaches of American football
African-American players of American football
American football defensive tackles
Alabama Crimson Tide football coaches
Coaches of American football from Mississippi
Detroit Lions coaches
Jacksonville Jaguars coaches
LSU Tigers football coaches
LSU Tigers football players
Miami Dolphins coaches
Players of American football from Mississippi
Texas Longhorns football coaches
UTSA Roadrunners football coaches
20th-century African-American sportspeople